The Chenini Member is a geological member of the Ain el Guettar Formation in Tunisia, whose strata date back to the Late Aptian to Early Albian stages of the Cretaceous period. The lithology consists of coarse sandstones with occasional conglomerates and mudstones. Dinosaur remains are among the fossils that have been recovered from the formation.

Vertebrate paleofauna 
The Chenini Member during the Early Cretaceous period was a marsh-like habitat with swamps and plenty of water. The most famous dinosaur discoveries made here include Carcharodontosaurus and Spinosaurus.

 Carcharodontosaurus saharicus
 Spinosaurus cf. aegyptiacus
 Sauropod indet
 Iguanodont indet
 Ornithocheiridae indet

See also 
 List of dinosaur-bearing rock formations
 Geology of Tunisia

References

Further reading 
 S. Bouaziz, É. Buffetaut, M. Ghanmi, J.-J. Jaeger, M. Martin, J.-M. Mazin, and H. Tong. 1988. Nouvelles découvertes de vertébrés fossiles dans l'Albien du sud tunisien [New discoveries of fossil vertebrates in the Albian of southern Tunisia]. Bulletin de la Société Géologique de France, 8e série 4(2):335-339 
 J. Le Loeuff, É. Buffetaut, G. Cuny, Y. Laurent, M. Ouaja, C. Souillat, D. Srarfi and H. Tong. 2000. Mesozoic continental vertebrates of Tunisia. 5th European Workshop on Vertebrate Palaeontology, Staatliches Museum für Naturkunde, Geowissenschaften Abteilung. Program. Abstracts. Excursion Guides 45

Geologic formations of Tunisia
Lower Cretaceous Series of Africa
Albian Stage
Aptian Stage
Sandstone formations
Fluvial deposits
Paludal deposits
Paleontology in Tunisia
Formations